Protonaegleria is a genus of excavates.

References

Percolozoa
Excavata genera